A temporary capital or a provisional capital is a city or town chosen by a government as an interim base of operations due to some difficulty in retaining or establishing control of a different metropolitan area. The most common circumstances leading to this are either a civil war, where control of the capital is contested, or during an invasion, where the designated capital is taken or threatened.

Current 
Examples include:
Bazarak became the de facto temporary capital of the Islamic Republic of Afghanistan on 17 August 2021 following the 2021 Taliban offensive, Bazarak was the last provincial capital to fall under Taliban rule.
 Brades acts as the de facto temporary capital of Montserrat since 1998, after the de jure capital of Montserrat at Plymouth in the south of the island was abandoned in 1997 after it was buried by the eruptions of the Soufriere Hills volcano in 1995. Interim government buildings have since been built at Brades, becoming the new temporary capital in 1998. The move is intended to be temporary, but it has remained the island's de facto capital ever since. A new official capital is now being constructed in the Little Bay area.
 Lviv in western Ukraine is set to be a planned de facto temporary capital of Ukraine should the capital city of Kyiv fall to the Russian forces due to the ongoing invasion.

Historical 
Examples include:

 During the Hungarian War of Independence (1848-1849) the government moved from Pest-Buda to Debrecen.
 During the Colombian Civil War (1860–1862), Pasto was declared temporary capital by the leaders of the Colombian Conservative Party.
 During the lead-up to and the early weeks of the American Civil War, the provisional government of the Confederate States of America met in Montgomery, Alabama before relocating to Richmond, Virginia after Virginia joined the Confederacy. Likewise, after the fall of Richmond in 1865, the government evacuated to Danville, Virginia before Robert E. Lee's surrender at Appomattox Court House.
 During the Franco-Prussian War (1870-1871), France's Government of National Defence maintained two temporary capitals. President Louis-Jules Trochu led government ministries in besieged Paris, while Interior Minister Léon Gambetta evacuated other ministries to Bordeaux.
 During the British Raj rule of India, some parts of the administration temporarily moved each summer to Simla, where the weather is cooler. 
 The First Philippine Republic government under Emilio Aguinaldo had four different temporary capitals throughout the Philippine Revolution against Spanish colonization and subsequent American occupation: Malolos, Bacolor, Cabanatuan, and Palanan.
 During the Serbian Campaign in World War I, the government of the Kingdom of Serbia temporarily moved its seat from Belgrade to Niš (1914-1915) and Corfu (1916-1918).
 During World War I, the government of Romania moved to Iaşi after the fall of Bucharest to the Central powers
 The Pan-Russian "White" regime of Alexander Kolchak in Omsk during the Russian Civil War.
 During the Finnish Civil War in 1918, Vaasa served as the temporary capital of White Finland when the Red Guards controlled the capital de jure, Helsinki. Vaasa continued to serve as the capital until the Battle of Helsinki. 
 Following the Armistice of 11 November 1918 that ended fighting in World War I, Berlin as the capital was considered too dangerous for the National Assembly to use as a meeting place, because of its street rioting after the German Revolution. Therefore, the calm and centrally located Weimar was chosen as the temporary capital (see Weimar Republic).
 Lithuania in Kaunas rather than Vilnius during the interwar period when Poland controlled the latter city (see Temporary capital of Lithuania).
 During the Spanish Civil War, the Nationalists initially had a temporary capital at Burgos; once the Nationalists started to besiege Madrid, the Republicans maintained temporary capitals first at Valencia then at Barcelona. The capital returned to Valencia when Barcelona fell to the Catalonia Offensive.
 During the Second Sino-Japanese War, the capital of the Republic of China at Nanking was captured by the Empire of Japan, forcing the Republic of China to relocate to Chungking.
 At the height of the Chinese Civil War in 1949, the Republic of China evacuated its central government, military, and many loyal citizens—totalling at around 1.2 to 2 million individuals—to the city of Taipei, located on the island of Taiwan. Taipei remains the de facto capital of the Republic of China today.
 The Parliament of Finland moved from Helsinki to Kauhajoki during the Winter War.
 During World War II due to evacuation actions following Nazi Germany's invasion and the Battle of Moscow the Soviet Union had different de facto capitals:
 Kuybyshev (now Samara) — planned temporary capital in case of occupation of Moscow and de facto temporary administrative and diplomatic capital
 Sverdlovsk (now Yekaterinburg) — de facto temporary industrial capital
 Kazan — de facto temporary scientific capital
 Tyumen — de facto temporary spiritual capital
 During the First Indochina War (1946–1954) the government moved from Hanoi to Việt Bắc.
 Germany after 1945 considered Berlin to remain the German capital. But due to the onset of the Cold War Berlin itself was divided and 161 kilometers (100 miles) beyond the Inner German Border within the Soviet-controlled zone that would soon become the German Democratic Republic.  As a result, Bonn was established as a temporary capital for the Federal Republic of Germany until the two countries reunited in 1990. The Federal Republic of Germany's government and the bulk of its offices has since moved to Berlin, but a large portion of its offices remain in Bonn. (The German Basic Law has only mentioned the capital since 2008.)
 During the Korean War, the South Korean government temporarily moved its capital to Pusan (Busan) before the Korean People's Army advance which conquered and occupied Seoul. South Korea reestablished Seoul as the permanent capital of South Korea after the Korean War Armistice. North Korea also claimed in its 1948 Constitution that Seoul was its de jure capital, and that Pyongyang is a temporary capital. 
 During the Bangladesh Liberation War, the Provisional Government of Bangladesh declared Mujibnagar as the temporary capital, even though the seat of the government in exile remained in Calcutta for most of the war.
 The Sahrawi Arab Democratic Republic claimed temporary capitals previously in Bir Lehlou and currently in Tifariti, in contrast to its de jure capital of Laâyoune, which is controlled by Morocco. Its de facto headquarters is in Tindouf, Algeria.
 The Transitional Federal Government of Somalia met in various locations within its territory rather than Mogadishu while the latter was deemed too dangerous to meet in.
 During the Libyan Civil War, the National Transitional Council (NTC) declared its base of operations in Benghazi to be the temporary capital of the Libyan Republic, as the NTC had previously declared its capital to be Tripoli, controlled by Muammar Gaddafi's Great Socialist People's Libyan Arab Jamahiriya.
 In the wake of the 2014–15 Yemeni coup d'état, ousted President Abd Rabbuh Mansur Hadi declared Aden the provisional capital of Yemen while Sana'a is controlled by the rebel Houthis.
 The Turkish cabinet used İzmir as a temporary capital for a short while after coup attempt in 15 July 2016.

See also 

 Government in exile

References 

Capitals
Political geography